The Niagara Falls Street Circuit was a temporary street circuit located near Niagara Falls, New York, USA, which briefly hosted Trans-Am Series for a single season in 1988.

References

Defunct motorsport venues in the United States
Motorsport venues in New York (state)